Balázs Győrffy (born April 21, 1979) is a Hungarian politician, member of the National Assembly (MP) from Fidesz Veszprém County Regional List between 2010 and 2014, and from his party's national list since 2014. He served as mayor of Nemesgörzsöny from 2006 to 2014. He has been the inaugural president of the Hungarian Chamber of Agriculture (NAK) since 2013.

He is serving as leader of the MAGOSZ (advocacy organization of the Hungarian agrarian workers) in Veszprém County. After the 2010 elections he was elected to the Parliamentary Committee on Agriculture. Győrffy was appointed Chairman of the Subcommittee to investigate abuses of the previous Socialist government.

Personal life
He is married. His wife is Henrietta Győrffy-Bojás. They have a son, Huba.

References

1979 births
Living people
Hungarian Calvinist and Reformed Christians
Members of the National Assembly of Hungary (2010–2014)
Members of the National Assembly of Hungary (2014–2018)
Members of the National Assembly of Hungary (2018–2022)
Members of the National Assembly of Hungary (2022–2026)
Mayors of places in Hungary
People from Pápa